The 2016 South African municipal elections were held on 3 August 2016, to elect councils for all district, metropolitan and local municipalities in each of the country's nine provinces.  It was the fifth municipal election held in South Africa since the end of apartheid in 1994; municipal elections are held every five years.

The ruling African National Congress (ANC) was the largest party overall, earning 53.9% of the total vote. It was followed by the official opposition Democratic Alliance (DA) with 26.9% and the Economic Freedom Fighters (EFF) with 8.2%. Popular support for the ANC fell to its lowest level since 1994, a shift which was most pronounced in the country's urban centres. Despite marginal gains in some areas, the ANC lost control of three metropolitan municipalities – namely Nelson Mandela Bay, City of Tshwane and City of Johannesburg – to opposition parties as a result of the election. The DA achieved its best local electoral performance so far, while the EFF, contesting its first local government election, improved on its performance in the 2014 general election. The local polls were widely seen a turning point in the political landscape of South Africa, as the dominance of the ANC was greatly diminished while coalition and minority governments became more widespread.

Electoral system

Local government in South Africa consists of municipalities of various types. The largest metropolitan areas are governed by metropolitan municipalities, while the rest of the country is divided into district municipalities, each of which consists of several local municipalities. After the 2016 election there were eight metropolitan municipalities, 44 district municipalities and 205 local municipalities.

The councils of metropolitan and local municipalities are elected by a system of mixed-member proportional representation, in which half of the seats in each municipality are elected on the first-past-the-post system in single-member wards and the other half of the seats are allocated according to the proportional representation (PR) system. The latter takes into account the number of ward seats won by a party, and ensures that the final number of seats held by that party is proportional to their percentage of the total vote.  District municipality councils are partly elected by proportional representation and partly appointed by the councils of the constituent local municipalities. Voters in both metropolitan and local municipalities elect a single ward candidate as well as a proportional representative in their municipal council. Residents of municipalities that form part of district councils (that is, excluding metropolitan municipalities) also cast a third vote to elect a proportional representative for their district council in addition to the two votes they cast for their local council.

Political parties 

The ruling African National Congress (ANC) has been the majority party in most municipalities across South Africa, with the exception of those in the Western Cape, since 1994. Its overall share of the vote decreased slightly from 65.7% in 2006 to 62.93% in 2011 amid growing discontent regarding the state of the country's economy and perceived corruption within the organisation since the end of apartheid. The party was led by Jacob Zuma, who was replaced by Cyril Ramaphosa at the 57th National Conference in December 2017.

The official opposition Democratic Alliance (DA) increased its total share of the vote from 16.3% in 2006 to 24.1% in 2011, while assuming control of most Western Cape councils. The party contested an election for the first time under the leadership of Mmusi Maimane, who succeeded Helen Zille as leader in May 2015.

The newly formed Economic Freedom Fighters (EFF), led by expelled ANC Youth League leader Julius Malema, contested its first municipal election since its formation in 2013. Smaller parties included the Inkatha Freedom Party (IFP), which held several municipalities in its stronghold KwaZulu-Natal, and the Congress of the People (COPE), which was expected to decrease its share of the vote after the decline in support following the 2014 general election. The National Freedom Party (NFP), a breakaway from the IFP led by former IFP chairperson Zanele kaMagwaza-Msibi, was barred from participating in the election after it failed to pay its registration fee to the Independent Electoral Commission. The party had support in areas where the IFP had been strong, and prior to the election governed a number of municipalities in KwaZulu-Natal in coalition with the African National Congress. The NFP was, however, allowed to contest the election in one municipality, Nquthu, where its local branch had paid the registration fee on time. The party obtained just two seats in this council, down from five seats in 2011.

Campaigning 
The country's ruling party, the ANC, was reported to have spent R1 billion (US$71 million) in campaigning in the election. The Democratic Alliance (DA) was reported to have spent R350 million and the Inkatha Freedom Party (IFP) spent between R15 million and R20 million. The United Democratic Movement (UDM) reportedly spent under R4 million contesting the election.

The top three issues of the election were the constantly high unemployment rate, corruption and poor service delivery by government.  A major campaign issue during the election was corruption within the ANC, in particular President Jacob Zuma's relationship with the Gupta family and funding for the construction of his homestead at Nkandla.

The ANC was accused by commentators and the DA of trying to make racism a key electoral issue by racialising the election.

The run-up to the election was marked by a number of murders of ANC candidates allegedly by rivals within the ANC in an effort to secure lucrative positions in local government. Inter ANC rivalries also sparked protests from 20 to 22 June 2016 in the City of Tshwane over the ANC's selection of Thoko Didiza as mayoral candidate for the city that left 5 people dead.

In January 2017 the ANC was taken to court by a South African public relations expert (Sihle Bolani) for work done during the elections, Bolani stated that the ANC used her to launch and run a covert R50 million fake news and disinformation campaign aimed at discrediting opposition parties during the election.

In his book How to Steal a City (2017), author Crispian Olver states that corruption and state capture within the ANC governed Nelson Mandela Bay Metropolitan Municipality led to the party losing the city to the DA in the 2016 elections.

Municipal demarcation changes
South Africa's Municipal Demarcation Board announced changed ward demarcations and municipal boundaries, following former Cooperative Governance and Traditional Affairs Minister Pravin Gordhan suggesting the redrawing of boundaries to make municipalities more sustainable and financially viable.  There are 34 cases that affect 90 municipalities.  The DA objected, and MP James Selfe has announced that the DA would take the Board to court over what it says is clear party-motivated and irrational boundary determinations.

Target municipalities
The two major political parties announced that they were specifically targeting certain municipalities for the 2016 election.  The African National Congress (ANC) claimed that, in addition to maintaining control of certain municipalities, it would also take control of the City of Cape Town.  The Democratic Alliance announced a "big five" plan to target specific municipalities: three metropolitan; Tshwane, Johannesburg, Nelson Mandela Bay, and Tlokwe Local Municipality for takeover, and an increased majority in Cape Town.

Nelson Mandela Bay
Danny Jordaan was appointed Mayor of Nelson Mandela Bay in 2015 and also ran for the ANC in the 2016 election. On April 13, 2015, the Democratic Alliance selected former DA Parliamentary Leader Athol Trollip as its mayoral candidate.

Johannesburg

Incumbent Mayor Parks Tau represented the African National Congress in the election as its mayoral candidate, despite some ANC members having suggested Geoff Makhubo as a potential alternative. The Democratic Alliance selected businessman Herman Mashaba over Wits professor and DA councillor Rabelani Dagada as its mayoral candidate on January 16, 2016.  The EFF did not announce a mayoral candidate, but deployed Floyd Shivambu to build EFF election machinery in Johannesburg for the upcoming election.

Tshwane

The incumbent mayor of Tshwane was Kgosientso Ramokgopa of the African National Congress. On 20 June 2016 riots broke out in Tshwane over the ANC's selection of Thoko Didiza as mayoral candidate for Tshwane. On 5 September 2015 the Democratic Alliance selected MPL Solly Msimanga over 2011 mayoral candidate Brandon Topham and councillor Bronwyn Engelbrecht.

Cape Town
Incumbent DA Mayor Patricia de Lille was renominated in January 2016 as her party's mayoral candidate.

Election results

The ruling African National Congress (ANC) remained the largest party, obtaining 53.91% of the votes nationally, a fall from the 62.93% achieved in 2011. The Democratic Alliance (DA) remained the second largest at 26.90%, up from 24.1% in 2011. The Economic Freedom Fighters obtained 8.19% in their first municipal election.

The decline in ANC support was most significant in urban areas, with the ANC losing its outright majority in 4 of the country's 8 metropolitan municipalities for the first time since 1994. The ANC retained Buffalo City, Mangaung and eThekwini, but with decreased majorities in Buffalo City and eThekwini. In the City of Johannesburg and Ekurhuleni, the ANC lost its majority but retained a plurality.
The DA increased its majority in the City of Cape Town, and achieved pluralities in Tshwane and Nelson Mandela Bay, its first in metropolitan municipalities outside of the Western Cape.  Of the 4 hung metropolitan municipalities, the ANC retained Ekurhuleni through a coalition, while the DA gained control of Nelson Mandela Bay through a coalition, and formed minority governments in Johannesburg and Tshwane.

National results by party

|- style="background:#e9e9e9;"
!rowspan="2" colspan="2" style="text-align:left"|Party
!colspan="2" style="text-align:center"|Ward
!colspan="2" style="text-align:center"|PR
!colspan="2" style="text-align:center"|Ward + PR
!colspan="2" style="text-align:center"|DC
!colspan="2" style="text-align:center"|Total
|- style="background:#e9e9e9;"
!Votes
!%
!Votes
!%
!Votes
!%
!Votes
!%
!Votes
!%
|-
|  ||7,978,983||53.34%||8,124,223||54.49%||16,103,206||53.91%||5,347,126||61.68%||21,450,332||55.65%
|-
|  ||4,004,865||26.77%||4,028,765||27.02%||8,033,630||26.90%||1,429,868||16.52%||9,463,498||24.57%
|-
|  ||1,217,805||8.14%||1,229,548||8.25%||2,447,353||8.19%||755,326||8.73%||3,202,679||8.31%
|-
|  ||632,102||4.23%||636,722||4.27%||1,268,824||4.25%||554,558||6.41%||1,823,382||4.73%
|-
|  ||88,501||0.59%||145,759||0.98%||234,260||0.78%||99,395||1.15%||333,655||0.87%
|-
|  ||115,993||0.78%||113,288||0.76%||229,281||0.77%||78,268||0.90%||307,549||0.80%
|-
|  ||76,351||0.51%||91,271||0.61%||167,622||0.56%||70,378||0.81%||238,000||0.62%
|-
|  ||62,582||0.42%||67,779||0.45%||130,361||0.44%||55,824||0.65%||186,185||0.48%
|-
|  ||61,966||0.41%||62,463||0.42%||124,429||0.42%||26,536||0.31%||150,965||0.39%
|-
|  ||28,638||0.19%||28,849||0.19%||57,487||0.19%||29,180||0.34%||86,667||0.23%
|-
|  ||24,819||0.17%||40,758||0.27%||65,577||0.22%||19,002||0.22%||84,579||0.22%
|-
|  ||28,171||0.19%||29,807||0.20%||57,978||0.19%||16,629||0.19%||74,607||0.19%
|-
|  ||24,592||0.16%||24,889||0.17%||49,481||0.17%||23,987||0.28%||73,468||0.19%
|-
|  ||15,240||0.10%||15,239||0.10%||30,479||0.10%||13,762||0.16%||44,241||0.11%
|-
|  ||19,030||0.13%||17,223||0.12%||36,243||0.12%||648||0.01%||36,891||0.10%
|-
|  ||7,975||0.05%||9,695||0.07%||17,670||0.06%||10,571||0.12%||28,241||0.07%
|-
|  ||9,801||0.07%||10,126||0.07%||19,927||0.07%||8,122||0.09%||28,049||0.07%
|-
|  |||341,030||2.28%||colspan="2" style="text-align:center"|N/A||341,030||1.14%||colspan="2" style="text-align:center"|N/A||341,030||0.89%
|- style="background:#e9e9e9;"
|colspan="2" style="text-align:left"| Total ||colspan="2"| 14,959,033 ||colspan="2"| 14,910,817 ||colspan="2"| 29,869,850 ||colspan="2"| 8,654,209 ||colspan="2"|38,524,059
|}

 PR = Proportional Representation 
 DC = District Council

Results by Municipal Type 

The statistics in this section are all sourced from the Independent Electoral Commission's official website unless specified otherwise.

Metropolitan Municipalities

District Municipalities

Local Municipalities

Seats won by province
Seat allocations in local and metropolitan councils, sorted by province.

Eastern Cape

In the following table, green rows indicate those won by the ANC with a majority, blue rows indicate municipalities won by the DA with a majority, and light blue rows indicate a DA minority,  light green cells indicate municipalities won by the ANC with Minorities or Coalitions.

Free State

In the following table, green cells indicate those municipalities won by the ANC with Majorities.  Light blue cells indicate those won by the DA with a minority or coalition,  Light green cells indicate those won by the ANC with a minority or coalition.

Gauteng

In the following table, green cells indicate those municipalities won by the ANC with Majorities, light green cells indicate municipalities won by the ANC with Minorities or Coalitions.  blue cells indicate municipalities won by the DA with a majority,  light blue cells indicate those won by the DA with a minority or coalition.

KwaZulu-Natal

In the following table, green rows indicate those won by the ANC with a majority, light green rows indicate those won by the ANC with a minority or coalition, red rows indicate those won by the Inkatha Freedom Party (IFP) with a majority, and pink rows indicate lead by an IFP minority.  Orange cells indicate those one by National Freedom Party (NFP), and  light orange  indicate those led by NFP coalition.

Limpopo

In the following table, green cells indicate those municipalities won by the ANC with Majorities.   Light blue cells indicate those won by the DA with a minority or coalition.

Mpumalanga
The ANC's control of the municipalities in this province was not significantly challenged with the party winning over 55% support in every municipality. The DA failed to make any progress in this historically strongly ANC region, with the party's vote share shrinking by a few percentage points overall against a national backdrop of gains for the party. Due in large part to the lack of substantial DA support across the province, the EFF was able to become the main opposition to the ANC in four of the seventeen municipalities.

In the following table, green rows indicate those won by the ANC.

North West

In the following table, green rows indicate those won by the ANC, and light green rows indicate those with an ANC minority or coalition. The municipal boundaries are determined by the Organised Local Government Act, 1997 (Act 52 of 1997)

Northern Cape

In the following table, green rows indicate those won by the ANC majority, and  light green  cells indicate municipalities led by an ANC coalition or minority.  Light blue rows indicate municipalities won led by a DA coalition or minority.  Yellow cells indicate municipalities led by a COPE coalition or minority.

Western Cape

In the following table, green cells indicate those municipalities won by the ANC with Majorities, light green cells indicate municipalities won by the ANC with Minorities or Coalitions.  blue cells indicate municipalities won by the DA with a majority,  light blue cells indicate those won by the DA with a minority or coalition.

Notes

References

Municipal elections
Municipal elections
2016